Kvinner og Klær (KK), is a Norwegian weekly women's magazine published in Oslo, Norway. It is the oldest and largest magazine for women in the country.

History and profile
Kvinner og Klær was launched under the title of Nordisk Mønster-Tidende as a magazine concerning needlework patterns in 1874. In 1940 it was renamed as Kvinner og Klær and its profile was modified as being a general interest women's magazine. In 1970 its official title was changed to the abbreviation KK. 

The magazine, which is headquartered in Oslo, is owned by Aller Media and is published weekly. The editor is Gjyri Helén Werp, who took over for Bente Engesland in 2008. 

The target group of the magazine is women in their 30s. In 2003 KK was one of the best-selling two women's magazines in Norway with a circulation of 70,000 copies. The 2010 circulation of the magazine down to 48,604 copies. Its circulation down to 44,017 copies in 2012.

See also
List of Norwegian magazines

References

External links
 Official website

1874 establishments in Norway
Magazines established in 1874
Magazines published in Oslo
Norwegian-language magazines
Weekly magazines published in Norway
Women's magazines published in Norway